Destruction is an annual professional wrestling event promoted by New Japan Pro-Wrestling (NJPW). The event has been held since 2007 as a pay-per-view (PPV). From 2013 to 2014, the event also aired outside Japan as an internet pay-per-view (iPPV). Since 2015, the event has aired worldwide on NJPW's internet streaming site, NJPW World. Destruction is currently held in late September as the first major event after the conclusion of the G1 Climax, with several matches at the event often stemming from previous matches in the G1 Climax. Destruction also continues the road to the January 4 Dome Show, which starts at the G1 Climax.

Recently, Destruction events have not featured IWGP Heavyweight Championship matches, instead being headlined by matches either for another major title, such as the IWGP Intercontinental Championship, or for the Tokyo Dome IWGP Heavyweight Championship challenge rights certificate, which is the prize for winning the G1 Climax. IWGP Heavyweight Championship matches are, instead, typically featured at King of Pro-Wrestling, which is held soon after in early October. The 2018 Destruction event was the first time since 2013 (and the first time since NJPW started doing multiple Destruction Events) that featured an IWGP Heavyweight Championship match and the first time to not include an IWGP Intercontinental Championship match since 2012. From 2007 until 2011 the event was held at Ryōgoku Kokugikan in Tokyo but since 2012 the event has been held at various different venues, mainly at World Memorial Hall in Kobe.

Events

See also

List of New Japan Pro-Wrestling pay-per-view events

References

External links
The official New Japan Pro-Wrestling website
Destruction at ProWrestlingHistory.com